Newton Falls is a village in southwestern Trumbull County, Ohio, United States. The population was 4,557 at the 2020 census. It is part of the Youngstown–Warren metropolitan area. The city takes its name from the two sets of waterfalls within the village, each on different branches of the Mahoning River. The city is known for its unique ZIP code (44444) and for its covered bridge, which is the second oldest in the state of Ohio.

History
It is believed that early property owners of Newton Township spent time in Newtown, Connecticut before departing for the Ohio Country and that the name Newton may be a corruption of Newtown. The village's name stems from its location on the falls on the Mahoning River. It grew in to a home of the steel manufacturing industry, as did much of the region, aided by its location along the river and the proximity of the nearby Ravenna Training and Logistics Site.

On May 31, 1985, an F5 tornado struck the city as part of the 1985 United States-Canadian tornado outbreak, a deadly series of tornadoes that swept through Ohio, Pennsylvania, New York, and Ontario. The tornado that hit Newton Falls was the only F5 in Ohio that day, and damaged most of the downtown, destroying many homes and businesses, and damaging the senior and junior high schools (it destroyed the gymnasium and rendered the junior high unusable). There were between 70 and 80 injuries, and 400 families were left homeless. The Ohio Army National Guard credited warning sirens for the lack of fatalities. A monument was erected in 2022 memorializing the devastation. It is situated at the corner of Broad and Center Streets. 

On July 6, 2012, the city was shaken by a shooting rampage in the East River Gardens apartment complex. Robert Brazzon murdered four people, including a 15-year-old boy, before taking his own life in a city cemetery.

Geography

The Mahoning River flows through Newton Falls.

Demographics

2010 census
As of the census of 2010, there were 4,795 people, 2,064 households, and 1,236 families residing in the village. The racial makeup of the village was 97.6% White, 0.8% African American, 0.1% Native American, 0.1% Asian, 0.2% from other races, and 1.2% from two or more races. Hispanic or Latino of any race were 1.1% of the population.

There were 2,064 households, of which 29.3% had children under the age of 18 living with them, 41.9% were married couples living together, 13.9% had a female householder with no husband present, 4.1% had a male householder with no wife present, and 40.1% were non-families. 34.8% of all households were made up of individuals, and 15.2% had someone living alone who was 65 years of age or older. The average household size was 2.30 and the average family size was 2.98.

The median age in the village was 40 years. 23.4% of residents were under the age of 18; 7.8% were between the ages of 18 and 24; 25.3% were from 25 to 44; 26.4% were from 45 to 64; and 17.1% were 65 years of age or older. The gender makeup of the village was 47.5% male and 52.5% female.

2000 census
As of the census of 2000, there were 5,002 people, 2,171 households, and 1,346 families residing in the city. The population density was 2,193.1 people per square mile (847.1/km). There were 2,376 housing units at an average density of 1,041.7 per square mile (402.4/km). The racial makeup of the city was 98.10% White, 0.38% African American, 0.42% Native American, 0.06% Asian, 0.04% Pacific Islander, 0.24% from other races, and 0.76% from two or more races. Hispanic or Latino of any race were 0.64% of the population.

There were 2,171 households, out of which 28.9% had children under the age of 18 living with them, 46.1% were married couples living together, 12.1% had a female householder with no husband present, and 38.0% were non-families. 33.3% of all households were made up of individuals, and 14.9% had someone living alone who was 65 years of age or older. The average household size was 2.30 and the average family size was 2.95.

In the village the population was spread out, with 24.8% under the age of 18, 8.0% from 18 to 24, 29.1% from 25 to 44, 22.2% from 45 to 64, and 15.9% who were 65 years of age or older. The median age was 37 years. For every 100 females there were 89.2 males. For every 100 females age 18 and over, there were 85.7 males.

The median income for a household in the village was $32,827, and the median income for a family was $41,250. Males had a median income of $34,067 versus $21,992 for females. The per capita income for the village was $16,039. About 8.1% of families and 10.5% of the population were below the poverty line, including 18.8% of those under age 18 and 4.5% of those age 65 or over.

Arts and culture

Covered Bridge

Newton Falls is home to the early 19th-century Newton Falls covered bridge, which was constructed over the Mahoning River in 1831. A walkway was added to the side of the bridge in 1921–1922. In 1985 the bridge was repaired after being damaged by the Niles/Wheatland tornado. In December 2007 the bridge was reopened after a two-year restoration funded by government grants. In July 2009 a delivery truck damaged the bridge and rendered it out of service until repairs could be made. It reopened in 2010. The Newton Falls bridge is considered the second oldest existing covered bridge in Ohio, the oldest covered bridge in use on its original site, the only covered bridge in the state with a covered crosswalk, and the last surviving covered bridge in Trumbull County. Built on the Town Lattice truss plan, the bridge is 123 feet long and twenty-four feet wide. It has a clear span of 101 1/2 feet and a sixteen-foot-wide roadway.

Fourth of July festivities

The village last celebrated Dicker Days in 2021.
It holds the largest Fourth of July Festivities in the county, which have been annual since 1946. The normally sleepy little town brings in up to 40,000 spectators to view the Parade and Fireworks, as well as a week-long carnival with entertainment provided by the Newton Falls Fourth of July Festivities Committee which is made up entirely of volunteers. The committee raises money for the fireworks through a Car Show, Bike Show, and 10,000 Dollar Raffle, in addition to donations.

Government

The village government consists of five elected city councilmen (each representing different wards), an elected mayor (who serves on the council and votes in the event of a tie), and a village manager. The council meets on the first and third Wednesday of the month at 6:00 pm in the Council Chambers of the administration building.

 Mayor: Ken Kline (term expires 12/31/2023)
 Ward 1: Gideon "Bud" Fetterolf (term expires 12/31/2023)
 Ward 2: John Baryak (term expires 12/31/2023)
 Ward 3: Tesa Spletzer (term expires 12/31/2025)
 Ward 4: Christopher Granchie (term expires 12/31/2023)
 At-Large: Julie Stimpert (term expires 12/31/2025)
 Village Manager: Pamela Priddy (interim) 
 Law Director: Bradric Bryan 
 Finance Director: Sean Housley (interim) 
 Village Clerk: Michael Acomb

Education

Newton Falls is served by the Newton Falls Exempted Village Schools district. The current schools serving Newton Falls include:
 Newton Falls Elementary/Middle School – grades K-5
 Newton Falls Junior/Senior High School – grades 6-12

Media

Newspapers
 The Bridge (defunct) 
 The Newton Falls Herald (defunct)
 The Review
 The Weekly Villager

Transportation
Major highways that pass through the village include:
   Interstate 80
   State Route 5
   State Route 534

The Baltimore & Ohio's Pittsburgh to Chicago main line ran through the town. "The Tower", a historic train station, was demolished in 2011 after suffering extensive damage in a train derailment.

Notable people
 Clara Louise Bell, artist
 Patricia Cooksey, horse jockey
 Edward H. Ives, Wisconsin State Senator
 Jack Kucek, major league baseball player
 Earnie Shavers, heavyweight boxing contender

References

External links
 City website

Villages in Trumbull County, Ohio
Villages in Ohio